Marotrao Kannamwar became the chief minister of Maharashtra on 20 November 1962. He succeeded Yashwantrao Chavan, who had been appointed defence minister of India by Jawaharlal Nehru. Kannamwar had previously been buildings and communications minister in Chavan's cabinet.

List of ministers
The ministry consisted of 16 cabinet ministers.
The ministry also contained 15 deputy ministers.

References

Indian National Congress
K
K
Cabinets established in 1962
Cabinets disestablished in 1962